Arcobacter canalis is a bacterium from the genus of Arcobacter.

References

Campylobacterota
Bacteria described in 2018